Outis (a transliteration of the Ancient Greek pronoun  = "nobody" or "no one") is an often used pseudonym that appeared famously in Classical Greek legends. Modern artists, writers, and others in public life have adopted the use of this pseudonym in order to hide their identity and it has been used for fictional characters as well.

Ancient Greek origin of the pseudonym 

The Homeric hero Odysseus used the pseudonym "Outis" when he was fighting the Cyclops Polyphemus and the monster demanded his name. Odysseus replied instead that the pronoun was his name in order to trick the monster. After Odysseus had put out the monster's eye, Polyphemus shouted in pain to the other Cyclopes of the island. When they shouted back, inquiring whether Polyphemus was in danger, he replied that "Nobody" was trying to kill him, so presuming that he was not in any danger, none of them came to his rescue. The story of the Cyclops can be found in the Odyssey, book 9 (in the Cyclopeia).

Use of the name "Nobody" can be found in five different lines of Book 9. 

First of all in line 366:

Then in line 369:

Then in line 408:

In line 455:

And in line 460:

Uses of the pseudonym Outis 

 In the New York Evening Mirror (January 14, 1845), Edgar Allan Poe denounced the poet Henry Wadsworth Longfellow as a plagiarist. Longfellow remained silent on the matter, but a defender for Longfellow did appear, an anonymous writer who signed his letters only as "Outis".  Speculation as to the identity of Outis has mentioned Cornelius Felton, Lawrence Labree, and Poe himself.
 Henry Stevens was an American rare book dealer and a graduate of Yale University. In 1845 he went to London 'on a book-hunting expedition' and remained there until his death in 1886. As an antiquarian he helped to build up several great American libraries. In 1877, under the pseudonym of 'Mr. Secretary Outis', he projected and initiated a literary association named, The Hercules Club.

 István Orosz (1951-), Hungarian visual artist, adopted the use of the pseudonym Utisz, a phonemic respelling of the Greek Outis: that is, both are pronounced //. The hidden meaning of the ancient tale is very close to the visual pitfalls created by Orosz. In his work he employs visual paradox, double meaning images, and optical illusions – all of them are some kind of attack upon the eye, as a symbolic gesture to Odysseus. Orosz doubles even himself: from time to time, he signs his works as Utisz, the pseudonym borrowed from Cyclopeia. The most artful Greek, Odysseus, also used as a pseudonym the word meaning No-man, and as we know, with that exchange of names, then Polyphemos the Cyclops’ eye came into the world. The gouging out of the eye, or deception to the eye, also accompanied the works of Orosz/Utisz, if only metaphorically. Trompe-l'œil – we refer with an art historical expression to those images in which illusion guides the gaze. Orosz often uses such artifice, though he is completely aware of the danger of these deceptive procedures. He put it this way at a symposium a few years back: I hope my intentions are clear, in the ambitions of a Hungarian artist at the turn of the century, who does not tell the truth only to be caught in the act. (Introduction by Guy d'Obonner) 
 "Outis" is the pseudonym of Henri Antoine Meilheurat des Pruraux for O il cattolicismo o la morte in Leonardo nr 7 (29 March 1903).
 "Kaniel Outis" is the pseudonym used by the protagonist, Michael Scoffield, in the fifth season of the television series Prison Break.  This is one of the story's parallels with the Odyssey; others including the protagonist's imprisonment in the fictional Ogygia prison (named after Ogygia, in which Odysseus was imprisoned by the nymph Calypso), the main antagonist's code name being Poseidon, and the protagonist's struggle to return home to his wife, who lives in Ithaca, New York.

Uses of the similar pseudonym Nemo 

 Hablot Knight Browne (1815–1882) was a British graphic artist, well known as the illustrator for the works of Charles Dickens. Among others he illustrated The Pickwick Papers, David Copperfield, and Martin Chuzzlewit. Browne adopted the pseudonym "N. E. M. O."  Soon, however, he became "Phiz", another pseudonym, well suited for the creator of "phizzes"—delightful caricatures, as seen in his illustrations. Nemo is also the given name of the scrivener with a secret in Dickens's Bleak House. 
 Camille Claudel (1864–1943), a French sculptor and graphic artist (as well as model, student, and lover to Auguste Rodin) had a pet canary named "Nemo".  It was mentioned as the alter ego of Camille Claudel in some personal letters by Rodin.
 "Nemo" is the name given by a law-writer of Charles Dickens's Bleak House, whose death and suspected identity set in motion key elements of the plot.
 "Captain Nemo" is a fictional character of Jules Verne's novels Twenty Thousand Leagues Under the Sea and The Mysterious Island.  Captain Nemo is a mysterious hero and a scientific genius who roams the depths of the sea in his submarine, the Nautilus, which he built on a deserted island.
 "Little Nemo" is the main character in a series of comic strips by Winsor McCay (1871–1934), which appeared weekly in the New York Herald between 1905 and 1913.
 "Finding Nemo" is a cartoon film that was released in 2003.

Other "Nobody" pseudonyms 
 My Name is Nobody (Il mio nome è Nessuno, also known as Lonesome Gun) is a 1973 Spaghetti Western comedy film, directed by Tonino Valerii and Sergio Leone.
 A Native American character in the Western film Dead Man calls himself "Nobody".
 No One is a nu metal music group from Chicago, Illinois. The original name of the four-piece band was Black Talon. They have been active since 1994.
 Harold Cohen (1854-1927), an American author, wrote science fiction novels under the pseudonyms "Harry Enton" and "Noname". After some titles his well-known series Frank Reade was continued by Luis Senarens (1865–1939) who used "Noname" as well.
 In Doctor Who, The Doctor's anonymity is influenced by the anonymous Time Traveler in the novel The Time Machine by H. G. Wells.
 "Nobody" is a costumed vigilante seen in both the Teenage Mutant Ninja Turtles comics by Mirage Studios and IDW Publishing, as well as the 2003 animated series.
 In the Terra Ignota tetralogy by Ada Palmer, "Outis" is the nickname given by Achilles to the narrator of the fourth book, Perhaps the Stars. In the first three books, Outis is a hidden friend and follower of main character and narrator, Mycroft Canner, who occasionally alludes to 'having no one beside him'.
 The rapper and poet Fatimah Nyeema Warner is known professionally under the stage name Noname.

See also 

Alan Smithee
Luciano Berio (composer of Outis, a musical action in two parts)
István Orosz

References

External links 
OUTIS-Centro di Drammaturgia Contemporanea-Milano
Utisz in Gallery Diabolus
Poster book of István Orosz

Alter egos
Informal personal names
Odyssey